This list is of the Cultural Properties of Japan designated in the category of  for the  Circuit of Hokkaidō.

National Cultural Properties
As of 1 July 2019, thirty Important Cultural Properties with sixty-nine component structures have been designated, being of national significance.

Prefectural Cultural Properties
As of 1 May 2019, twenty-five properties with the same number of component structures have been designated at a prefectural level.

Municipal Cultural Properties
As of 1 May 2019, one hundred and eleven properties with one hundred and eighteen component structures have been designated at a municipal level.

Registered Cultural Properties
As of 1 September 2016, one hundred and forty-three properties have been registered (as opposed to designated) at a national level.

See also
 Cultural Properties of Japan
 National Treasures of Japan
 List of Historic Sites of Japan (Hokkaidō)
 List of Cultural Properties of Japan - paintings (Hokkaidō)
 Hokkaido Museum
 Historical Village of Hokkaido

References

External links
  Cultural Properties in Hokkaido

Cultural Properties,Hokkaidō
Buildings and structures in Hokkaido
Hokkaidō
Structures,Hokkaidō